"Ain't Going Down ('Til the Sun Comes Up)" is a song co-written and recorded by American country music artist Garth Brooks. It was released in July 1993 as the lead single from his album In Pieces. The song also appears on The Hits, The Limited Series, The Ultimate Hits, Double Live, and Triple Live. The spelling of the song has varied from album to album, and is also spelled "Ain't Going Down (Til the Sun Comes Up)."  The song was written by Brooks, Kent Blazy, and Kim Williams. It is in the key of G Major.

Content
A girl heads out for a Friday evening date at 6:00 in the evening. Her mother tells her to be back in bed before dawn. After the teenagers see a show and get a bite to eat, they head out for some late-night dancing. Eventually, they spend the night there and head out to her house at 4:00 A.M. The girl does not get home in time, and is grounded and punished with chores, but sneaks out again at 6:00 P.M. the next evening.

Writing and production
Garth provided the following background information on the song in the CD booklet liner notes from The Hits:

"Kent Blazy, Kim Williams, and I sat out on the back porch of Kent and Sharon Blazy's house and decided we wanted to write something that was a lot of fun, for no other reason than just that, fun.  "Ain't Going Down (Til the Sun Comes Up)" is what we came up with.  Kent and Sharon had just moved into their new home and this was the first song we had ever written at their house.  They still reside there, and hopefully there are a lot more songs on that back porch."

Mark Casstevens played acoustic guitar, Chris Leuzinger played electric guitar, Milton Sledge played drums, Mike Chapman played bass guitar, Rob Hajacos played fiddle, Bobby Wood played electric piano, Terry McMillan played harmonica, and Trisha Yearwood provided harmony vocals.

Chart performance
"Ain't Going Down ('Til The Sun Comes Up)" debuted at number 37 on the U.S. Billboard Hot Country Singles & Tracks for the week of August 7, 1993. The song reached Number One on the Billboard Hot Country Songs chart for the week of September 18, 1993. The song then fell to No. 2 on September 25, 1993, when Tracy Byrd's "Holdin' Heaven" climbed to No. 1. However, on the chart week of October 2, 1993, "Ain't Going Down" returned to No. 1.

Year-end charts

References

External links
"Ain't Goin' Down ('Til The Sun Comes Up)" Lyrics

1993 singles 
1993 songs
Garth Brooks songs 
Liberty Records singles
Songs written by Garth Brooks
Songs written by Kent Blazy
Song recordings produced by Allen Reynolds
Songs written by Kim Williams (songwriter)